Lasswade railway station served the village of Lasswade, Midlothian, Scotland from 1868 to 1964 on the Esk Valley Railway.

History 
The station opened on 12 October 1868 by the Esk Valley Railway. The station was situated at the end of Westmill Road. There was a moderate sized goods yard which was accessed from the west and consisted of four short sidings, one running behind the platform and going into a stone-built goods shed. Lasswade gas works was north of the goods shed, with St Leonards paper mill being a short distance to the north along Westmill Road. Access to the yard was controlled by the signal box, which was behind the platform near its west end. This signal box was closed in the 1930s. The station closed to passengers on 10 September 1951 but goods yard remained open until closed along with the line on 18 May 1964.

References

External links 

Disused railway stations in Midlothian
Former North British Railway stations
Railway stations in Great Britain opened in 1868
Railway stations in Great Britain closed in 1951
1868 establishments in Scotland
1964 disestablishments in Scotland
Bonnyrigg and Lasswade